What Dreams May Come is a novel by American author Manly Wade Wellman. It is the second of three books featuring supernatural investigator John Thunstone. The book derives its title from a line in Hamlet's famous "To be, or not to be..." soliloquy.

Background
The character of John Thunstone had previously appeared in a series of short stories by Wellman. Originally published in popular pulp magazines of the day, several of them were collected and reprinted in an anthology, Lonely Vigils. Wellman decided to follow the anthology with the character's first book-length adventure. In his introduction to the novel Wellman mistakenly states that, while many of the locations he mentions have real-life counterparts, Claines is an entirely fictional locale, and such a place has never existed in England. However, a small community named Claines exists, north of Worcester.

Main characters
John Thunstone is an American scholar and investigator of the paranormal. He has the imposing physical stature and square-jawed good looks of an archetypical literary hero. Although he suffers from no disability, he always carries a cane which was given to him by his good friend Judge Pursuivant. The cane's shaft conceals a silver blade forged by Saint Dunstan, which serves as a formidable weapon against the supernatural creatures Thunstone encounters in his travels.

Gram Ensley is the richest man in Claines who also owns the majority of its land. He lives at Chimney Pots, an expansive manor which has been in his family for centuries. Ensley is a respected, if feared, figure in the community and makes significant contributions to the local parish although he does not regularly attend services.

Constance Bailey is a self-proclaimed white witch who works at the inn where Thunstone stays. Her benevolent acts of magic are well received by the majority of Claines' inhabitants although she continually draws the ire of Mr. Ensley who openly states his belief that she should be expelled from town.

Plot summary
While visiting London, John Thunstone hears strange stories concerning the nearby hamlet of Claines, a pair of ancient pagan artifacts, and the annual ritual that accompanies them. As the date of the ritual is only a few days away Thunstone decides to travel to Claines and witness the ritual for himself. While there he experiences strange visions of the distant past and gradually realizes their significance to the present.

External links

1983 American novels
American fantasy novels
1983 fantasy novels
Doubleday (publisher) books